The Society for Biodemography and Social Biology, formerly known as the Society for the Study of Social Biology and before then as the American Eugenics Society, is dedicated to "furthering the discussion, advancement, and dissemination of knowledge about biological and sociocultural forces which affect the structure and composition of human populations."

History
Initially known as the American Eugenics Society, or AES, the Society formed after the success of the Second International Congress on Eugenics (New York, 1921). AES founders included Madison Grant, Harry H. Laughlin, Irving Fisher, Henry Fairfield Osborn, Charles Davenport and Henry Crampton. The organization started by promoting racial betterment, eugenic health, and genetic education through public lectures, exhibits at county fairs, etc.

The AES primarily used fitter family contests to help promote its mission. These fitter family contests took place in public festivals or fairs. Physical appearance, behavior, intelligence, and health were just a few of the qualities that the AES looks at while determining the fittest family. The AES would give out prizes, trophies, and medals to the winning families. Additionally, the AES would sponsor displays and exhibits that featured statistics on the births of "undesirable" or "desirable" children at the fairs and festivals. An example of such a display from the 1920s and 1930s statistics claimed as follows: Every sixteen seconds a child is born in the United States. Out of those children a capable, desirable child is born every seven and a half minutes, whereas a undesirable, feebleminded child is born every forty-eight seconds, and a future criminal is born every fifty seconds. To conclude, the display would argue that every fifteen seconds, a hundred dollars of taxpayers' money went towards supporting the mentally ill and undesirable.

The AES also sought to promote eugenic policies at the US state and federal level. Harry H. Laughlin promoted eugenic sterilization in the early twentieth century. By the late 1920s eugenic sterilization laws were being enforced by more than two dozen US states, including Alabama, Alaska, Arizona, Arkansas, California, Colorado, Connecticut, Delaware, Florida, Georgia, Hawaii, Idaho, Illinois, Indiana, Iowa, Kansas, Kentucky, Louisiana, Maine, Maryland, Massachusetts, Michigan, Minnesota, Mississippi, Missouri, Montana, Nebraska, Nevada, New Hampshire, New Jersey, New York, North Carolina, North Dakota, Ohio, Oklahoma, Oregon, Pennsylvania, Rhode Island, South Carolina, South Dakota, Tennessee, Texas, Utah, Vermont, Virginia, Washington, West Virginia, Wisconsin, and Wyoming (Sterilization law in the United States). By 1933, California had enforced eugenically sterilization laws on more people than any of the other US states combined. These people mainly included people of color and foreign immigrants. These laws led to court cases and lawsuits, such as, Buck v. Bell,1927, and Skinner v. Oklahoma,1942.  

In 1926, the society published a Eugenics Catechism, arguing that eugenics was supported by the Bible, and therefore ought to be promoted by Christians.

During the presidency of Henry Farnham Perkins from 1931 to 1933, the AES worked with the American Birth Control League. Margaret Sanger, a birth control activist, "was a member of the of the AES in 1956 and established the Birth Control League in 1921".

Under the direction of Frederick Osborn the Society started to place greater focus on issues of population control, genetics, and, later, medical genetics. In 1930, the Society included mostly prominent and wealthy individuals, and membership included many non-scientists. The demographics of the Society gradually changed, and by 1960, members of the Society were almost exclusively scientists and medical professionals. Consequentially, the Society focused more on genetics and less on class-based eugenics.

After the Roe v. Wade decision was released in 1973, the Society was reorganized and renamed The Society for the Study of Social Biology. Osborn said, "[t]he name was changed because it became evident that changes of a eugenic nature would be made for reasons other than eugenics, and that tying a eugenic label on them would more often hinder than help,"

The name was most recently changed to Society for Biodemography and Social Biology.

Journal
The Society's official journal is Biodemography and Social Biology, which was originally established in 1954 as Eugenics Quarterly. It was renamed to Social Biology in 1969 and to its current title in 2008.

List of presidents

 Irving Fisher 1922–1926 (Political Economy, Yale University)
 Roswell H. Johnson 1926–1927 (Cold Spring Harbor, Univ. of Pittsburgh)
 Harry H. Laughlin 1927–1929 (Eugenics Record Office)
 Clarence C. Little 1929 (Pres., University of Michigan)
 Henry Pratt Fairchild 1929–1931 (Sociology, New York University)
 Henry Farnham Perkins 1931–1934 (Zoology, University of Vermont)
 Ellsworth Huntington 1934–1938 (Geography, Yale University)
 Samuel Jackson Holmes 1938–1940 (Zoology, University of California)
 Maurice Bigelow 1940–1945 (Columbia University)
 Frederick Osborn 1946–1952 (Osborn-Dodge-Harriman RR connection)
 Harry L. Shapiro 1956–1963 (American Museum of Natural History)
 Clyde V. Kiser 1964–1968 (differential fertility, Milbank Memorial Fund)
 Dudley Kirk 1969–1972 (Demographer, Stanford University)
 Bruce K. Eckland 1972–1975 (Sociology, University of North Carolina)
 L. Erlenmeyer-Kimling 1976–1978 (Genetic Psychiatry)
 Gardner Lindzey 1979–1981 (Center for Advanced Study, Behavioral Sciences)
 John L. Fuller 1982–1983 (Behavioral genetics)
 Michael Teitelbaum 1985–1990 (US Congress staff; US population policy)
 Robert Retherford 1991–1994 (East-West Institute, Hawaii; funded by AID)
 Joseph Lee Rodgers 1994, 1995 (family influences)
 Hans-Peter Kohler, 2007–2012 (University of Pennsylvania)
 Board: Jason Boardman, Timothy Gage, Ulrich Mueller, Christine Himes Syracuse University (Status in 2012).

See also

 American Society of Human Genetics
 British Eugenics Society
 Eugenics in the United States
 Human Betterment Foundation

References

External links
The Society for Biodemography and Social Biology
Biodemography and Social Biology The academic journal.

Biology organizations
Eugenics in the United States